The American Sportscopter Ultrasport 496 is an American helicopter that was designed and produced by American Sportscopter of Newport News, Virginia. Now out of production, when it was available the aircraft was supplied as a kit for amateur construction.

Design and development
The Ultrasport 496 is a two-seat trainer development of the Ultrasport 254 and, like that model, is named for its empty weight in pounds. The aircraft was designed to comply with the US Experimental - Amateur-built aircraft rules. It could also have been registered as a FAR 103 Ultralight Vehicles rules exemption trainer. It features a single main rotor, a two-seats in side-by-side configuration enclosed cockpit with optional doors, skid-type landing gear and a four-cylinder, horizontally opposed, air-cooled, two-stroke, dual-ignition  Hirth F-30 engine.

The aircraft fuselage is made from composites. Its  diameter two-bladed rotor employs an ATI 012 (VR-7 mod) airfoil at the blade root, transitioning to an ATI 008 (VR-7 mod) airfoil at the tip. The dual controls include cyclic controls mounted from the cockpit ceiling, but are otherwise conventional. The tail rotor is ring-mounted and the horizontal tailplane mounts end-fins for directional stability. A ballistic parachute was a factory option.

The manufacturer estimated the construction time from the supplied kit as 60 hours.

Operational history
In June 2014 one example was registered in the United States with the Federal Aviation Administration, although a total of seven had been registered at one time.

Specifications (Ultrasport 496)

See also
List of rotorcraft

References

External links
Photo of an American Sportscopter Ultrasport 496

Ultrasport 496
2000s United States sport aircraft
2000s United States helicopters
Homebuilt aircraft
Single-engined piston helicopters